Tehachapi High School is the single comprehensive high school serving students in grades 9–12 in the Tehachapi, California area.

Tehachapi High School is part of the Tehachapi Unified School District, a K-12 school district. Tehachapi High School has a current enrollment of 1,500-plus, with district enrollment of approximately 4,900. THS has the reputation of being one of the preferred educational programs in Kern County, with test scores higher than many other high schools in the county, and highly honored athletics and activity programs.

The high school was founded circa 1928. Classes were held in a home originally built by Russell Peery in the 1890s in Cummings Valley. The house was dismantled and moved to Tehachapi where it served as the high school until the original high school buildings could be completed.

The current campus was opened in 2003 after the community passed a $1.5 million bond in 1999 for the purpose of building a new high school. It is divided into wings with an open plan. There are no interior hallways at Tehachapi High. The design originated with a Central Valley school without the Tehachapi Valley's wind. When the school first opened, students were injured by the wind slamming doors open and shut, requiring changes to the doors' construction. 

The gym and cafeteria underwent major transformations to give it a cafe-like feel with bar stools, booths, and individual seating to accommodate nearly 1,700 students using funds that could not be used to pay staff or for educational purposes. Over a summer, the Associated Student Body team got together to effect the changes.

THS was voted 6th best high school in California and is a California Distinguished School.

References

External links
Tehachapi High School website
Tehachapi Unified School District

High schools in Kern County, California
Tehachapi, California
Public high schools in California
2003 establishments in California